Whiskyville is an unincorporated community in Lorain County, Ohio, United States.

History
Whiskyville was so named in the 19th century on account of there being many distilleries located in the town. The community was named Whiskyville after a still was built there in 1838 by Elias Mann.  Whiskyville is located at the crossing of state route 113 and state route 58.

References

Unincorporated communities in Lorain County, Ohio
Unincorporated communities in Ohio